Advantage gambling, or advantage play, refers to legal methods used to gain an advantage while gambling, in contrast to cheating. The term usually refers to house-banked casino games, but can also refer to games played against other players, such as poker. Someone who practises advantage gambling is often referred to as an advantage player, or AP. Unlike cheating, which is by definition illegal, advantage play exploits innate characteristics of a particular game to give the player an advantage relative to the house or other players. While not illegal, advantage play is often discouraged and some advantage players may be banned by certain casinos. 

A skillful or knowledgeable player can gain an advantage at a number of games. Card games have been beaten by card sharps for centuries. Some slot machines and lotteries with progressive jackpots can eventually have such a high jackpot that they offer a positive return or overlay when played long term, according to gambling mathematics. Some online games can be beaten with bonus hunting.

World Series of Blackjack Champion Mike Aponte – one of the ring leaders of the infamous MIT Card Counting Team featured in the movie 21 – is producing a feature length documentary about the subject titled Advantage Player. The film is directed by Hrag Yedalian and is slated for release in 2024.

Sports and horse betting 

Sports and horse betting can be beaten by placing arbitrage bets, which involve placing bets at different bookmakers who are offering different lines (odds). Many online sports books now offer bonuses like free bets or free money. These bonuses usually come with a stipulation that the bettor place a certain number of bets. For example, a site may offer a bettor $50 free if they deposit $100 and place a total of $1000 in bets. These can reduce the vig taken by the house or even offer the bettor a small advantage. 

Another form of advantage can be found by betting the "middle" on a sports event. This situation occurs when two bookmakers are offering different lines on the same event, or if a bettor has placed a bet and the bookmaker changes the line. The bettor simply takes the most favorable lines at each bookmaker, and if the result of the contest is between the numbers, or in the "middle", then the bettor wins both bets.

For example, Bookmaker A lists the Jets to be a 4-point favorite over the Bills. Bookmaker B has the Jets as just a 2-point favorite. The advantage player may bet the Bills +4 with Book A and then the Jets -2 with Book B. If the Jets win by 3, the advantage player collects on both bets. If the Jets win by either 2 or 4, the advantage player collects on one winning bet and the other "push." And if the Jets win or lose by any other total, the two bets cancel out, leaving the advantage player to pay only the vigorish on the bets. Given typical 10-cent lines, a middle need only win 1 time in 21 to break even, which is a realistic goal – the middle is always a plausible result since it is based on the actual strength of the teams.  Middling is an example of line arbitrage.

Special offers
Using special offers provided by bookmakers it is possible for a skilled bettor to put the odds in their favour. Special offers may include; cashback on specific events, enhanced odds and comp points. To profit from these specials, a skilled bettor will use betting, laying and dutching to create their own book on an event that may not guarantee profit but will still put the odds in their favour instead of the bookmaker(s) involved. Sign up bonuses are also classed as special offers and can be used in a similar way to lock in a profit regardless of the result using the principles of matched betting.

Betting exchanges
Betting exchanges offer advantage players a chance to make a larger profit than possible with bookmakers because exchanges charge commission only on the net winnings in a particular betting market.  One way to make money on the exchanges is "trading" - in the above example, the Jets might be a favorite decimal odds of 1.90 to defeat the Bills.  If a "trader" thinks these odds too long he may bet $1000 on the Jets, and should he prove correct and the odds on the Jets get shorter, "lay off" by laying, say, a $1016 bet against the Jets at 1.87.  If the Jets win, he collects $900 on his bet on the Jets and pays out approximately $884 on the bet he laid against the Jets.  If the Jets lose, he loses his $1000 stake on the Jets but keeps the $1016 stake on the bet he laid against the Jets.  Either way, the "trader" makes a $16 profit and he will pay a commission only on that profit (usually not more than 5% or 80 cents in this example) for a net profit of $15.20 regardless of the result.  Of course, if the odds go the wrong way the "trader" may lose money but most exchanges do not charge a commission in the event of a net loss.

Blackjack
Blackjack and other table games can usually be beaten with card counting, hole carding, shuffle tracking, edge sorting, or several other methods. The players most skilled in these techniques have been nominated to the Blackjack Hall of Fame.

Video poker
Some video poker games, such as full pay Deuces Wild, can be beaten by the use of a strategy card devised by computer analysis of the game and often for sale in casino gift shops. Similar to the Blackjack Hall of Fame, there is an internet "Video Poker Hall of Fame".

Some video poker games with a progressive jackpot for a royal flush offer in excess of 100% payback when the jackpot amount exceeds a certain level. Organized teams of video poker players are known to occupy banks of machines in this situation, playing until the jackpot is won (which may take many hours).

Poker

Poker can offer a long-term advantage to a skilled player because it is played against other players and not against the house. The casino usually takes a rake (commission) or a time charge. Whether a poker player can win enough from the game to cover the rake and make a profit depends, aside from the rake level, not only on the player's skill, but also on the opposition's lack thereof - the degree of difficulty can vary widely from casino to casino. Tables with relatively easy opposition are referred to as "soft."

There is another advantage to playing poker as opposed to games where play is against the house: since the house has no direct interest in the outcome of a poker game, successful poker players can operate openly without risk of being banned by casinos.

While in the short term luck primarily determines a poker player's results, over the long term the skilled player will invariably profit if playing against weaker competition. A player can profit from their skill in many ways. For example, by understanding pot odds and implied odds, a player can assess whether it will be profitable to chase a flush or straight draw. Identifying exploitable patterns in an opponent's play also gives the skilled player an edge. For example, a weak opponent might almost never bluff, or might bluff far too often. Or an opponent might make huge bets only as bluffs, and make smaller bets with good hands (or vice versa). A skilled player noticing such patterns in an opponent's play can make better decisions when facing a bet from that player.

In live settings, some players will take advantage of tells, that is, opponent facial expressions and mannerisms that may give away information about the strength of the player's hand. Skilled players use all available information (not only an opponent's actions earlier in a hand, but also his or her actions during previous hands) to assess which action will be most profitable, be it a call or a fold, a bluff or a bet for value.

Other ways to gain an advantage

Dice control

Experts disagree about whether or not an advantage can be gained at some other games. One example is dice control. Authors Stanford Wong and Frank Scoblete have stated that by setting and throwing the dice in a certain way players can alter the odds at the game of craps enough to gain an advantage.

Pachinko

In the Japanese game of pachinko, there are numerous purported strategies for winning, the most reliable of which is to use inside information to learn which machines have the highest payout settings. Because of the "Stock", "Renchan", and tenjō systems, it is possible to make money by simply playing machines on which someone has just lost a huge amount of money. This is called being a "hyena". They are easy to recognize, roaming the aisles for a "Kamo" ("sucker" in English) to leave their machine in a favorable mode.

Angle shooting
"Angle shooting" is another type of advantage play.  Despite "angle shooting" being legal, it is possibly an unethical way to beat casino games. One way to get an advantage at a casino is "hole carding" where a player tries to look at the dealer's hole card in blackjack and then uses that information to play their hand differently. This clearly gives an advantage to the player since knowing your opponent's cards reduces the risks involved in the game. Taking advantage of incorrect payouts is another example of angle shooting. For example, if an inexperienced dealer pays 2 to 1 on a blackjack instead of 3 to 2, not correcting him or her is also taking advantage of an incorrect payout.

"Angle shooting" can also happen in poker. For instance, in no-limit poker a player may hide high denomination chips behind stacks of low denomination chips, giving off an appearance that their stack is less powerful than it really is. Another example is making an illegal move, which the player may later declare void if it suits them. While angle shooting is seen as "fair game" in games against the house, it is heavily frowned upon in games where players compete with other players, as it ruins the table atmosphere, makes the game less appealing to novice players, and is not in the spirit of the game.

Casinos and playrooms continually create new rules to defeat angle shooting techniques.

Comp hustling
Comp hustling can be another form of advantage gambling. Players, known as comp hustlers or comp wizards, who play games with a low house advantage or low bet size such as penny slots, can get more than their expected loss in free items from the casino. Many advantage players also take steps to maximize the comps they receive from their play.

Roulette wheel
Roulette wheels with manufacturing defects or uneven wear may land on some numbers with a statistically significantly greater frequency. It is sometimes possible, through large numbers of observations, or noting patterns of wear on the wheel's surface, to determine when this is the case and bet accordingly. Physician Richard Jarecki was able to exploit this to great effect at European casinos in the 1960s and 1970s.

Hazards
Casinos sometimes take measures to thwart players who they believe pose a threat to them, especially card-counters or hole-card players. However, some casinos tolerate card-counters who do not bet large amounts, who are not good at counting, or who do not use a large betting spread. 

Some countermeasures include shuffling when the deck is favorable to the player, imposing betting limits, "backing off" players by asking them not to play blackjack any more, or asking a player to leave the casino. In New Jersey, a player may not be asked to leave a table for counting cards, although the house may still impose betting limits or shuffle sooner. 

Players caught counting cards or hole-carding ultimately may find themselves listed in the Griffin Book and become unwelcome in most casinos.  The Griffin Book was sued, but there are other substitutes today. 

In the past, video poker and skillful progressive slot machine players were rarely ejected for winning, but the practice is common today. They may have their comps reduced or eliminated. 

Skillful sports bettors, known as "sharps", may have their betting limits reduced and may not be allowed to take advantage of bonuses at online sports books. Instead, skillful sports bettors may rely on "runners" to place and collect their bets.

Craps players are required to bounce their throws off the back wall of the table, to prevent a skilled thrower from affecting the outcome.

Advantage players abide by the established rules of the game and thus, in most jurisdictions, are not regarded as committing fraud against the casino. So, while they may face the above casino-imposed sanctions, they are able to operate without the threat of criminal prosecution for their behavior. This is not the case in all jurisdictions, however, and some advantage players have reported more aggressive countermeasures being taken even in well known gambling locations like Monte Carlo.

See also
Arbitrage betting
Matched betting

References

Gambling terminology